Giovanni Rinaldi Montorio (died 1546) was a Roman Catholic prelate who served as Bishop of Narni (1538–1546).

Biography
On 11 Jan 1538, Giovanni Rinaldi Montorio was appointed during the papacy of Pope Paul III as Bishop of Narni.
On 21 Mar 1539, he was consecrated bishop in the Sistine Chapel by Gian Pietro Carafa, Archbishop of Chieti, with Bartolomeo Siringi, Bishop of Castellaneta, and Alfonso Oliva, Bishop of Bovino, serving as co-consecrators. 
He served as Bishop of Narni until his death in 1546.

References

External links and additional sources
 (Chronology of Bishops) 
 (Chronology of Bishops) 

16th-century Italian Roman Catholic bishops
Bishops appointed by Pope Paul III
1546 deaths